Appias libythea, the striped albatross, is a small butterfly of the family Pieridae, that is, the yellows and whites, which is found in south and southeast Asia.

Description

See also
 List of butterflies of India
 List of butterflies of India (Pieridae)

Gallery

Notes

References

 
 
 
 
 

Appias (butterfly)
Butterflies of Asia
Butterflies of Singapore
Butterflies described in 1775
Taxa named by Johan Christian Fabricius